Mikhail Vasilyevich Isakovsky (– 20 July 1973) was a Soviet and Russian poet, lyricist and translator. Hero of Socialist Labour (1970).

Biography
Mikhail Isakovsky was born in the village of Glotovka, Yelninsky Uyezd, Smolensk Governorate, to a poor peasant family of ethnic Russians. A local priest taught him to read and write. Later he studied at a gymnasium for two years. His first poem, Просьба солдата, was published in 1914 in Russian newspaper Nov (Новь). In 1918, he joined the Communist Party of the Soviet Union. From 1921 until 1931, he worked in Smolensk newspapers. In 1927, his first book of poems, Провода в соломе, was published. In 1931, he left for Moscow.

Many poems of Isakovsky are set to music. The most famous are "Katyusha (Катюша)" (music by Matvey Blanter), "The Enemy Burned My Native Hut (Враги сожгли родную хату)" (music by Matvey Blanter), "In the Frontier Forest (В лесу прифронтовом)", and "Migrant Birds Fly (Летят перелётные птицы)", and "Lonely Accordion (Одинокая гармонь)". His songs "What You Were Is What You Are (Каким ты был, таким ты и остался)" and "Oh, Arrowwood Is Blooming (Ой, цветет калина)", set to music by Isaak Dunayevsky, were used in the film Cossacks of the Kuban (Кубанские казаки) (1949).

The song "The Enemy Burned My Native Hut (Враги сожгли родную хату)" (1945) was officially criticized for "pessimism" and was not printed or sung until 1956.

As a result of cooperation with Vladimir Zakharov, Isakovsky's poems set to music appear in the repertoire of the Pyatnitsky Choir. The most widely known of them are "Along the Village (Вдоль деревни)", "Seeing Off (Провожанье)" and "You Can Never Tell (И кто его знает)". According to Alexandra Permyakova, chief musician of the Pyatnitsky Choir, these songs made the Choir famous.

He twice received the Stalin Prize for his songwriting (1943, 1949). In 1970, he was awarded the title of Hero of Socialist Labour. He was also awarded four Orders of Lenin, in addition to other orders and medals.

He also published a book on the subject of poetry, О поэтическом мастерстве ('On Poetic Mastery').

Mikhail Isakovsky died in Moscow on 20 July 1973, and he was buried in the Novodevichy Cemetery.

References

External links
  

1900 births
1973 deaths
20th-century Russian poets
20th-century Russian translators
People from Yelninsky Uyezd
Communist Party of the Soviet Union members
Members of the Supreme Soviet of the Russian Soviet Federative Socialist Republic, 1947–1951
Members of the Supreme Soviet of the Russian Soviet Federative Socialist Republic, 1951–1955
Members of the Supreme Soviet of the Russian Soviet Federative Socialist Republic, 1955–1959
Members of the Supreme Soviet of the Russian Soviet Federative Socialist Republic, 1959–1963
Heroes of Socialist Labour
Stalin Prize winners
Recipients of the Order of Lenin
Recipients of the Order of the Red Banner of Labour
Bolsheviks
Socialist realism writers
Translators from Belarusian
Ukrainian–Russian translators
Russian lyricists
Russian male poets
Russian translators
Soviet male poets
Soviet translators
Burials at Novodevichy Cemetery